The 2017–18 Mississippi State Bulldogs women's basketball team represented Mississippi State University during the 2017–18 NCAA Division I women's basketball season. The Bulldogs, led by sixth-year head coach Vic Schaefer, played their home games at Humphrey Coliseum as members of the Southeastern Conference (SEC).

The Bulldogs were coming off a runner-up finish to fellow SEC team South Carolina in the NCAA tournament.

By beating Louisville 73-63 in overtime in the Final Four, Mississippi State played Notre Dame for the national championship; however, the Bulldogs were denied the title again, falling short 61–58 on a last-second three-pointer by Notre Dame's Arike Ogunbowale.

Offseason

Departures

Roster

Schedule

|-
!colspan=9 style="background:#660000; color:#FFFFFF;"| Exhibition

|-
!colspan=9 style="background:#660000; color:#FFFFFF;"| Non-conference regular season

|-
!colspan=9 style="background:#660000; color:#FFFFFF;"| SEC regular season

|-
!colspan=9 style="background:#660000; color:#FFFFFF;"| SEC Women's Tournament

|-
!colspan=9 style="background:#660000; color:#FFFFFF;"| NCAA Women's Tournament

Source:

Rankings

^Coaches' Poll did not release a second poll at the same time as the AP.

See also
 2017–18 Mississippi State Bulldogs men's basketball team

References

Mississippi State Bulldogs women's basketball seasons
Mississippi State
Mississippi State Bulldogs women's
Mississippi State Bulldogs women's
Mississippi State
NCAA Division I women's basketball tournament Final Four seasons